The 1992–1993 international cricket season was from September 1992 to April 1993.

Season overview

October

India in Zimbabwe

New Zealand in Zimbabwe

November

India in South Africa

West Indies in Australia

New Zealand in Sri Lanka

December

1992-93 Benson & Hedges World Series

Pakistan in New Zealand

January

England in India

February

1992–93 Wills Trophy

1992–93 Total International Series

Australia in New Zealand

March

Pakistan in Zimbabwe

England in Sri Lanka

Zimbabwe in India

Pakistan in the West Indies

References

1992 in cricket
1993 in cricket